Land navigation is the discipline of following a route through unfamiliar terrain on foot or by vehicle, using maps with reference to terrain, a compass, and other navigational tools. It is distinguished from travel by traditional groups, such as the Tuareg across the Sahara and the Inuit across the Arctic, who use subtle cues to travel across familiar, yet minimally differentiated terrain.  

Land navigation is a core military discipline, which uses courses that are an essential part of military training.  Often, these courses are several miles long in rough terrain and are performed under adverse conditions, such as at night or in the rain.

In the late 19th century, land navigation developed into the sport of orienteering. The earliest use of the term 'orienteering' appears to be in 1886.  Nordic military garrisons began orienteering competitions in 1895.

United States
In the United States military, land navigation courses are required for the Marine Corps and the Army. Air Force escape and evasion training includes aspects of land navigation. Army Training Circular 3-25.26 is devoted to land navigation.

See also
History of orienteering
Navigation
Piloting

References

Military education and training
Military terminology
United States Army doctrine
Orienteering competitions
Navigational equipment
Navigation
Orientation (geometry)